Мить весни. Дзвінкий вітер (1998) is the debut studio album by Ukrainian singer-songwriter Ruslana. Released on 14 February 1998 in her home country, there are two albums on this CD. "Myt Vesny", the first one, was recorded in the Luxen Studio and "Dzvinkyi Viter", the second one, contains songs performed live by Ruslana.

Track listing

Disc 1 : Myt vesny'

Disc 2 : Dzvinky viter

Charts
Album

Singles

References

Ruslana albums
1998 debut albums